Earl Liberty (born Mark Vidal on September 4, 1960 in Redondo Beach, California) is best known for being the bass player for Saccharine Trust from 1980–82, playing on the South Bay/San Pedro-based band's 1981 debut album, Paganicons, and participating in touring with SST labelmates Black Flag. His stage name was coined when Minutemen's D. Boon declared "Jesus Christ, you're fucking huge! You're as big as the Statue of Liberty!" which was then wedded to his earlier nickname of "Earl."

Liberty joined Saccharine Trust when previous bassist Luis Maldonado left the band disenchanted with their move towards jazz. After two years with Saccharine Trust, Liberty was recruited by Circle Jerks lead singer Keith Morris while at a Bangs concert, as then-bassist Roger Rogerson wanted to move from bass to guitar. The band had also recently recruited Chuck Biscuits (formerly of D.O.A. and Black Flag). The addition of Liberty gave the group a fuller sound, but a few shows into their first tour as a five-piece, Rogerson departed, and the remaining members continued on the tour without him. Liberty played his last show with the Circle Jerks at Perkins Palace in Pasadena on April 21, 1984.

In the summer of 2016 Earl joined up with former Saccaharine Trust bandmate Rob Holzman and Guitarist John Mccree to form a Hermosa Beach local band One Square mile Later joining the group was Noel Neville of the Resolutions.

References

Sources

External links
 Documentary interview with Mark Vidal, also known as Earl Liberty
 One Square Mile at Bandcamp

1960 births
Living people
American punk rock bass guitarists
Circle Jerks members
American male bass guitarists
20th-century American bass guitarists
20th-century American male musicians